Hamacantha is a genus of sponges in the family Hamacanthidae. This species in this genus differ from those in the other genera in this family through the presence of diancistras, distinctive microscleres.   These are thought to aid in framing the skeleton by joining monactine megascleres (that is megascleres that grow in only a single direction). This genus contains 30 species in three subgenera.

Species 
The following species are recognised:

Subgenus Hamacantha (Hamacantha) (Gray, 1867)

 Hamacantha (Hamacantha) boomerang (Hajdu & Castello-Branco, 2014)
 Hamacantha (Hamacantha) hortae Santín, (Grinyó Uriz & Gili &, 2021)
 Hamacantha (Hamacantha) johnsoni (Bowerbank, 1864)
 Hamacantha (Hamacantha) lundbecki (Topsent, 1904)
 Hamacantha (Hamacantha) schmidtii (Carter, 1882)
 Hamacantha (Hamacantha) simplex (Burton, 1959)

  Subgenus Hamacantha (Vomerula) Schmidt, 1880

  Hamacantha (Vomerula) acerata (Lévi, 1993)
 Hamacantha (Vomerula) agassizi (Topsent, 1920)
 Hamacantha (Vomerula) atoxa (Lévi, 1993)
 Hamacantha (Vomerula) azorica (Topsent, 1904)
 Hamacantha (Vomerula) bowerbanki (Lundbeck, 1902)
 Hamacantha (Vomerula) carteri (Topsent, 1904)
 Hamacantha (Vomerula) cassanoi (Lehnert & Stone, 2016)
 Hamacantha (Vomerula) esperioides (Ridley & Dendy, 1886)
 Hamacantha (Vomerula) falcula (Bowerbank, 1874)
 Hamacantha (Vomerula) forcipulata (Lévi, 1993)
 Hamacantha (Vomerula) integra (Topsent, 1904), Fibrous sponge
 Hamacantha (Vomerula) jeanvaceleti (Castello-Branco & Hajdu, 2018)
 Hamacantha (Vomerula) klausruetzleri (Castello-Branco & Hajdu, 2018)
 Hamacantha (Vomerula) mamoi (Ise, Woo, Tan & Fujita, 2019)
 Hamacantha (Vomerula) megancistra (Pulitzer-Finali, 1978)
 Hamacantha (Vomerula) microxifera (Lopes & Hajdu, 2004)
 Hamacantha (Vomerula) mindanaensis (Wilson, 1925)
 Hamacantha (Vomerula) papillata (Vosmaer, 1885)
 Hamacantha (Vomerula) popana (de Laubenfels, 1935)
 Hamacantha (Vomerula) tenda (Schmidt, 1880)
 Hamacantha (Vomerula) tibicen (Schmidt, 1880)
 Hamacantha (Vomerula) umisachii (Ise, Woo, Tan & Fujita, 2019)

Subgenus Hamacantha (Zygherpe) (Laubenfels, 1932)

 Hamacantha (Zygherpe) desmacelloides (Hajdu, Hooker & Willenz, 2015)
 Hamacantha (Zygherpe) hyaloderma (Laubenfels, 1932)

References 

Sponge genera